Nicolae Checerul (Cekerul ) Cuş (born 1873 Chișinău – November 21, 1946 Câmpulung Muscel) was a Bessarabian lawyer and politician.

Biography 
Nicolae Cekerul Cuş was the son of Michael Cekerul-Cuş. Nicolae Cus, jurist, attorney, student of the great economics professor I. Ciuprov (1874-1926) from Moscow, studied many specialized problems, statistics, etc. Leaving the advocacy he professed in St. Petersburg, Nicholae settled in his native village, Stodolna. He served as Member of the Moldovan Parliament, mandate validated from March 25, 1918 until November 27, 1918. He joined the peasant faction, but for unknown reasons he did not participate in the March 27, 1918 vote. After the Great Union, he was a member of the National Peasants' Party, Senator of Orhei (1932-1933).

On June 28, 1940, he fled to România, but after a year he returned to Bessarabia. In 1944, he finally fled to România, settling in Câmpulung Muscel. Nicholae Cekerul Cuş was married twice, his first wife graduated from the Faculty of Philosophy in Switzerland. She had no children. He died at Câmpulung-Muscel on November 21, 1946.

Bibliography 
Gheorghe E. Cojocaru, Sfatul Țării: itinerar, Civitas, Chişinău, 1998, 
Mihai Taşcă, Sfatul Țării şi actualele autorităţi locale, "Timpul de dimineaţă", no. 114 (849), June 27, 2008 (page 16)

External links 
 Nicolae CHECERUL-CUŞ, p.23
 Arhiva pentru Sfatul Tarii
 Deputaţii Sfatului Ţării şi Lavrenti Beria

Notes

Romanian people of Moldovan descent
1873 births
1946 deaths
Moldovan MPs 1917–1918
National Peasants' Party politicians
20th-century Romanian politicians
Members of the Senate of Romania